Solillada Saradara is a 1992 Indian Kannada-language romantic drama film directed and written by Om Sai Prakash and produced by K. Prabhakar. The film stars Ambareesh, Malashri and Bhavya.

Cast 
 Ambareesh as Krishna
 Malashri as Radha
 Bhavya as Rukmini
 Doddanna as Diwan
 Om Sai Prakash as Radha's Father
 Mukhyamantri Chandru as Rukmini's father, a landlord
 Jaggesh as Manohar, Diwan's illegitimate son
 Mysore Lokesh as Ramegowda
 Dingri Nagaraj as Tippeshi
 Padma Kumta as Bhadra
 Kaminidharan
 Ashalatha
 Rathnakar as a priest
 A. S. Murthy
 Killer Venkatesh as Veerabhadra
 Manjumalini as a villager

Soundtrack

The music of the film was composed and lyrics written by Hamsalekha. Audio was released on Lahari Music.

References

External links 
 

1992 films
1990s Kannada-language films
Indian romantic drama films
Films scored by Hamsalekha
Films directed by Sai Prakash
1992 romantic drama films